Major General Peter John Abigail,  (born 6 April 1948) is a retired Australian Army officer who held a number of senior commands, including Deputy Chief of Army (1998–2000) and Land Commander Australia (2000–2002). Following his retirement from the army, Abigail served as the Executive Director of the Australian Strategic Policy Institute from 2005 until 2011. He also served as a member of the three-person Ministerial Advisory Panel for the 2009 Defence White Paper.

Early life and background
Abigail was born on 6 April 1948 in Sydney, New South Wales, to William Henry Abigail and his wife Catherine (née McPhail).

Military career
Abigail spent 37 years in the army, being awarded the National Medal in 1981. Following promotion to major general in December 1996, he served in a range of senior leadership appointments.

As Assistant Chief of the Defence Force (Policy and Strategic Guidance) and then Head Strategic Policy and Plans (Australian Defence Headquarters) (1996–1998) he was responsible for key aspects of Defence policy, military strategy and capability development.

As Deputy Chief of Army (1998–2000) he was responsible for managing the army and its interaction with other Defence stakeholders. Abigail was appointed an Officer of the Order of Australia (AO) in 2000 for distinguished service to the Australian Defence Force and to the Australian Army in high level staff appointments.

In his final appointment, as Land Commander Australia (2000–2002), he commanded all of the army's operational forces, full-time and reserves, including those that were committed to operations in East Timor, Bougainville and Afghanistan. Abigail retired from the army in 2002.

Business career and later life
In 2003, Abigail formed a private company, Peter Abigail & Associates Pty Limited, specialising in strategic consultancy services. In April 2005 Abigail was appointed as Executive Director of the Australian Strategic Policy Institute, and served until 2011.

References

External links
 Distinguished Graduates, Australian Defence College, www.defence.gov.au

|-

1948 births
Australian generals
Australian military personnel of the Vietnam War
Living people
Officers of the Order of Australia
People from Sydney
Royal Military College, Duntroon graduates
University of New South Wales alumni